Saarburg is a former Verbandsgemeinde ("collective municipality") in the district Trier-Saarburg, in Rhineland-Palatinate, Germany. The seat of the Verbandsgemeinde was in the town Saarburg.
In January 2019 it was merged into the new Verbandsgemeinde Saarburg-Kell. 

The Verbandsgemeinde Saarburg consisted of the following Ortsgemeinden ("local municipalities"):

Ayl 
Fisch 
Freudenburg 
Irsch 
Kastel-Staadt 
Kirf 
Mannebach 
Merzkirchen 
Ockfen 
Palzem 
Saarburg
Schoden 
Serrig 
Taben-Rodt
Trassem 
Wincheringen

Former Verbandsgemeinden in Rhineland-Palatinate